"Misery Business" is a song by American rock band Paramore and serves as the lead single from their second studio album, Riot! (2007). The song was written about a past experience of the band's lead singer, Hayley Williams, which involved a male friend who she felt was being exploited by a girl; when Williams and her friend dated afterwards, she wrote the track in order to "finally explain my side of the story and feel freed of it all". The accompanying music video for "Misery Business" was the third to be directed by Shane Drake for the band, and Alternative Press named "Misery Business" the Video of the Year in 2007.  

"Misery Business" is considered the band's breakthrough hit and is credited with introducing the band to a mainstream audience. The track was commercially successful, peaking on the Billboard Hot 100 at No. 26 (for the week of January 12, 2008), making it the band's highest-charting single until "Ain't It Fun" reached No. 10 in 2014. It also peaked at No. 3 on the Hot Modern Rock Tracks chart. It was the group's first charting single in the UK with more than 20,000 copies created within less than a year of the song's debut. It also succeeded in many countries including Mexico, Argentina, Chile, and Brazil. On June 2, 2022, the song was certified six times platinum in the United States, the first of the band's songs to have sold six million units.

Concept
The phrase, "Misery Business", was first heard in a Stephen King adaptation of the psycho-thriller film, Misery (1990). The origin of the song is ambiguous with Williams giving conflicting explanations. The Fueled by Ramen website reports that Williams wrote the song based on feedback the band received after a question she posted on the band's LiveJournal asking what people were ashamed of. However, on the band's blog, Williams claims the song was written about a past experience involving a male friend who she felt was being manipulated by a girl, and later on when Williams and her friend began to date, she penned the lyrics to "finally explain my side of the story and feel freed of it all". Later, Williams addressed the lyrics in the chorus:

Williams joked on Twitter on May 27, 2013, that it was about London's Heathrow Airport. In May 2020, she finally revealed that it was about bandmate Josh Farro. She told Vulture, "When I was 13 or 14 and I had a crush on Josh, he didn't like me back. He would go hang out with his girlfriend, who I wrote 'Misery Business' about because I was a dick."

Controversy
On September 7, 2018, Williams announced during a concert that the band will play the song "for the last time for a really long time", mainly due to a line from the second verse that was deemed sexist and anti-feminist. Williams did not sing the song again until the 2022 Coachella Festival, when she performed an acoustic version with Billie Eilish. The song returned to Paramore's setlist during the band's Fall 2022 Tour.

Chart performance
At the time of the release of "Misery Business", Paramore was a guest on MTV's "Discover and Download" which gave the band time in the spotlight to reach out and explain the purpose of their album and how they wish to see it grow. This song is the group's first single to enter the Billboard Hot 100 chart. During the week of June 25, 2007, it debuted at #99 on the chart and reached #75 two weeks later before dropping off the chart in the following week. Due to increased digital downloads during the month of August 2007, it re-entered the Billboard Hot 100 during the chart week of September 6, 2007 at #34. It reached its peak position of #26 during the chart week of January 12, 2008. It was the band's highest-charting single at that time, prior to the release of "Ain't It Fun" in 2014, but "Misery Business" still remains the band's most-played song on the radio to date  whereas Ain't It Fun never succeeded on alternative radio due to the band's change of style as well as not having the staying power "Misery Business" had, despite charting higher; leaving "Misery Business" as their most popular song to date. It peaked at #3 on the Hot Modern Rock Tracks chart. It also attained moderate crossover success, reaching #12 on Pop Songs chart and #31 on Adult Pop Songs chart. The song was certified Platinum in the U.S on September 17, 2008, with over 1,000,000 digital downloads. In December 2010 the song topped the two million mark in paid downloads. It has sold 2,464,000 copies in the US as of June 18, 2014.

The single was re-released in the UK Accorto Record Store on February 11, 2008 and included three vinyl records. To date, it has peaked at #17 on the UK Singles Chart. It is also the group's first charting single in the UK. It was a success in many countries including Mexico, Argentina, Chile, Brazil and others. It debuted on the Dutch Top 40 peaking at #28 and in Finland at #23.

In 2009, the song was certified Platinum in Australia. Selling over 15,000 copies in New Zealand, the song was certified Gold on February 1, 2008, with the shipment of over 7,500 copies.

Critical reception
"Misery Business" is widely regarded as one of the band's best songs. In 2017, NME ranked the song number one on their list of the 10 greatest Paramore songs, and in 2021, Kerrang ranked the song number five on their list of the 20 greatest Paramore songs.

Music video
The music video was filmed at Reseda High School in Reseda, California. Directed by Shane Drake, who also directed Paramore's videos for "Pressure" and "Emergency", it features a band performance at a school.

The video starts out and has cut scenes of Paramore performing the song with an assortment of "RIOT!"s (a reference to the album's name) in the background all throughout the video. At the same time, a girl (Amy Paffrath), presumably the "whore" as subject in the song, ensues terror onto students at a high school. She pushes aside cheerleaders, cuts off another girl's braid, further injures a boy in an arm sling, and ruins a relationship between a couple by kissing the boy right in front of the girl. In the end, the band members themselves confront her and Williams gives her a taste of her own medicine by taking out her bra inserts and wiping the make-up off her face, thus revealing the girl's true identity and putting an end to her egotistical reign at the high school.

As of November 2022, the song has 250 million views on YouTube.

The video was nominated for the "Best Video" award at the Kerrang! Awards 2007 but lost to Fall Out Boy's "This Ain't a Scene, It's an Arms Race."

Fueled by Ramen (FBR+) also released an alternate cut of the video that removes the high school clips and features only performance segments.

Track listings
A CD and two 7" singles were released in the UK on June 18, 2008. The CD single features a new song, "Stop This Song (Love Sick Melody)", and the two vinyls feature two covers: an electronic remix of "My Hero" by the Foo Fighters, and "Sunday Bloody Sunday" by U2.

Charts and certifications

Weekly charts

Year-end charts

Certifications

In popular culture

In various media
It was in a season 7 episode of Degrassi: The Next Generation, and is included in the Music from Degrassi: The Next Generation soundtrack.
It is a playable track in the games Guitar Hero World Tour, in which Hayley Williams is also a playable character, as well as Rock Band 3.

Covers
Metalcore band, Sea of Treachery, has covered "Misery Business". Williams has praised their cover.

Other references
The Professional Bull Riders tour features a bull named Misery Business.

Interpolations
Singer-songwriter Olivia Rodrigo interpolated "Misery Business" into her 2021 single "Good 4 U", for which Williams and Farro consequently received co-writing credits.

Release history

References

External links
 Official Paramore LiveJournal

2007 songs
2007 singles
Paramore songs
Fueled by Ramen singles
Songs written by Hayley Williams
Music videos directed by Shane Drake
Songs written by Josh Farro
Sea of Treachery songs
Song recordings produced by David Bendeth
Machine Gun Kelly (musician) songs
Self-censorship